This is a list of mosques in Bahrain.

See also
 Islam in Bahrain
 Lists of mosques
 List of tourist attractions in Bahrain
 Destruction of Shia mosques during the 2011 Bahraini uprising

References

External links

 
Bahrain
Mosques